Quantick is a surname. Notable people with the surname include:

 David Quantick (born 1961), English novelist, comedy writer, and critic
 Bussmann and Quantick Kingsize, a radio show featuring David Quantick and Jane Bussmann
 John Quantick (1909–1972), Welsh footballer